Lorenzon is a surname. Notable people with the surname include:

Francesco Lorenzon (born 1991), Italian footballer
Gianni Solaro (born Gianni Lorenzon; 1926), Italian film and television actor
Juri Lorenzon (or Yuriy Lorentsson ), Russian rowing coxswain
Livio Lorenzon (1923–1971), Italian actor
Víctor Hugo Lorenzón (born 1977), Argentine footballer

See also 
 Lorenzoni
 Stadio Marco Lorenzon, a multi-use stadium in Rende, Italy

it:Lorenzon